Riverview Elementary School may refer to:

In Canada:
Riverview Elementary School, Quesnel

In the United States (by state):
Riverview Elementary School (Corona, California), Corona-Norco Unified School District
Riverview Elementary School (Riverview, Florida)
Riverview Elementary School (Baltimore, Maryland)
Riverview Elementary School (Denville, New Jersey)
Riverview Elementary School (Vancouver, Washington)
Riverview Elementary School, Silver Lake, Wisconsin
Riverview Elementary School
(Tonawanda, New York)]]